Morley Senior High School is an Independent Public high school located in Noranda, a northern suburb of Perth, Western Australia. The school provides an education to approximately 1,400 students from Year 7 to Year 12.

History
By the end of the 1960s, John Forrest Senior High School and Hampton Senior High School were desperately overcrowded. Morley High School was established in 1970, but without a campus of its own. At first, the school consisted of 9 demountable classrooms and 250 students on the grounds of John Forrest Senior High School. It had its own staff, principal and p&c association, but it used John Forrest's library, sports facilities and canteen. A campus of its own opened in 1972 to 830 students from the first 3 years. By 1975, Morley was a complete Senior High School.

In 2015, Morley Senior High School became an Independent Public School.

Notable alumni
 Tom Jervis (basketball player)
 Tammy MacIntosh (actress)
 Adrian Majstrovich (basketball player)
 Andrew Supanz (actor)

See also

 List of schools in the Perth metropolitan area

References

External links 
 Morley Senior High School web site

Public high schools in Perth, Western Australia
Educational institutions established in 1971
1971 establishments in Australia
Noranda, Western Australia